Gümmenen railway station is a railway station in the municipality of Ferenbalm, in the Swiss canton of Bern. It is an intermediate stop on the standard gauge Bern–Neuchâtel line of BLS AG.

Services 
 the following services stop at Gümmenen:

 Bern S-Bahn:

References

External links 
 
 

Railway stations in the canton of Bern
BLS railway stations